A Place in the Country is a 1969 novel by the British writer Sarah Gainham. It was the second in her Vienna trilogy following on from the popular first novel Night Falls on the City.

Synopsis
The novel follows Julia Homburg, once a celebrated actress and now sheltering in the countryside having survived the devastation of the Second World War. She encounters a British Army officer Robert Inglis serving in Vienna with the Allied Occupation Forces. Meanwhile, from her old friend the journalist returns Georg Kerenyi returns half-starved from the East.

References

Bibliography
 Burton, Alan. Historical Dictionary of British Spy Fiction. Rowman & Littlefield, 2016.
 Husband, Janet G. & Husband, Jonathan F. Sequels: An Annotated Guide to Novels in Series. American Library Association, 2009.
 Reilly, John M. Twentieth Century Crime & Mystery Writers. Springer, 2015.

1969 British novels
Novels by Sarah Gainham
Novels set in the 1940s
Novels set in Vienna
Weidenfeld & Nicolson books